Mikhail Moiseyevich Antonevich (November 5, 1912 – July 6, 2003) was a Soviet football player and coach.

Playing career
In 1934, he played for the team in Mytishchi and in 1935 in Moscow for FC GCOLIFK. In 1936, he spent some time at Spartak Moscow, where he remained on the bench. In the years 1937-1939 he played for the club Stalinec Moscow, and joined Dinamo Moscow. In 1941, he moved to Dinamo Minsk, and played three games, but due to the start of the Great Patriotic War he was forced to suspend performances. From 1944 he continued his career in the Minsk team. In 1947, he was player of Lokomotiv Moscow, where he served as team captain. In 1951, he finished his playing career. He was also an accomplished skier. In 1950, he became an Honored Master of Sports of the USSR.

Coaching career
After retiring he became a football coach. From 1952-1954 he helped train Lokomotiv Moscow. From 1957 to 1959 he led FC Terek Grozny (Nieftiannik Grozny). In 1964, he led the Kuban Krasnodar, but soon, in May of this year became manager of Spartak Ordzhonikidze. In 1965, he returned to Traktor Vladimir and later coached numerous other clubs. He died on July 6, 2003 in Moscow.

References

1912 births
2003 deaths
Sportspeople from Vitebsk Region
People from Sennensky Uyezd
FC Dinamo Minsk players
FC Dynamo Moscow players
FC Lokomotiv Moscow players
Soviet Top League players
FC Spartak Ivano-Frankivsk managers
FC Spartak Moscow players
FC Zorya Luhansk managers
FC Kuban Krasnodar managers
FC Khimik-Arsenal managers
Soviet football managers
Soviet footballers
Association football defenders